Mark Kasdan is an American screenwriter and film producer known for such films as Criminal Law, Silverado and Dreamcatcher.

Filmography

References

External links

Living people
American screenwriters
American film producers
Jewish American screenwriters
1941 births
21st-century American Jews
American people of German descent
People from Louisiana
People from Hammond, Louisiana